Cosmos is an album by the jazz saxophonist Lou Donaldson recorded for the Blue Note label, featuring Donaldson with Ed Williams, Leon Spencer, Melvin Sparks, Jerry Jemmott, Idris Muhammad and Ray Armando, with vocals by Mildred Brown, Rosalyn Brown and Naomi Thomas, arranged by Jimmy Briggs.

Reception
The album was awarded 1 star in an Allmusic review.

Track listing 
All compositions by Lou Donaldson except where noted
 "The Caterpillar" - 6:50
 "Make It with You" (David Gates) - 4:57
 "If There's Hell Below (We're All Going To Go)" (Curtis Mayfield) - 9:03
 "Caracas" - 8:24
 "I'll Be There" (Berry Gordy, Bob West, Hal Davis, Willie Hutch) - 5:24
 "When You're Smiling" (Joe Goodwin, Larry Shay, Mark Fisher) - 5:18
 Recorded at Rudy Van Gelder Studio, Englewood Cliffs, NJ on July 16, 1971.

Personnel 
 Lou Donaldson - varitone alto saxophone
 Ed Williams - trumpet
 Leon Spencer - organ
 Melvin Sparks - guitar
 Jerry Jemmott  - electric bass
 Idris Muhammad - drums
 Ray Armando - congas
 Mildred Brown, Rosalyn Brown, Naomi Thomas - vocals arranged by Jimmy Briggs

References 

Lou Donaldson albums
1971 albums
Blue Note Records albums
Albums produced by George Butler (record producer)
Albums recorded at Van Gelder Studio